The following is a partial list of the "D" codes for Medical Subject Headings (MeSH), as defined by the United States National Library of Medicine (NLM).

This list covers DNA-binding proteins. For other protein-related codes, see List of MeSH codes (D12.776).

Codes before these are found at List of MeSH codes (D12.776) § MeSH D12.776.256.920. Codes following these are found at List of MeSH codes (D12.776) § MeSH D12.776.275. For other MeSH codes, see List of MeSH codes.

The source for this content is the set of 2006 MeSH Trees from the NLM.

– dna-binding proteins

– adenovirus E2 proteins

– arac transcription factor

– basic helix-loop-helix transcription factors

– basic helix-loop-helix leucine zipper transcription factors
 – microphthalmia-associated transcription factor
 – sterol regulatory element binding proteins
 – sterol regulatory element-binding protein 1
 – sterol regulatory element-binding protein 2

– hypoxia-inducible factor 1
 – aryl hydrocarbon receptor nuclear translocator
 – hypoxia-inducible factor 1, alpha subunit

– myogenic regulatory factors
 – myod protein
 – myogenic regulatory factor 5
 – myogenin

– twist transcription factor

– upstream stimulatory factors

– basic-leucine zipper transcription factors

– activating transcription factors
 – activating transcription factor 1
 – activating transcription factor 2
 – activating transcription factor 3
 – activating transcription factor 4
 – activating transcription factor 6

– basic helix-loop-helix leucine zipper transcription factors
 – microphthalmia-associated transcription factor
 – sterol regulatory element binding proteins
 – sterol regulatory element binding protein 1
 – sterol regulatory element binding protein 2

– ccaat-enhancer-binding proteins
 – ccaat-binding factor
 – ccaat-enhancer-binding protein-alpha
 – ccaat-enhancer-binding protein-beta
 – ccaat-enhancer-binding protein-delta
 – transcription factor chop
 – Y box binding protein 1

– cyclic amp response element-binding protein

– cyclic amp response element-binding protein a

– cyclic amp response element modulator

– fos-related antigen-2

– interferon regulatory factor-1

– maf transcription factors
 – maf transcription factors, large
 – mafb transcription factor
 – oncogene protein v-maf
 – proto-oncogene proteins c-maf
 – maf transcription factors, small
 – maff transcription factor
 – mafg transcription factor
 – mafk transcription factor

– nf-e2 transcription factor
 – maf transcription factors, small
 – maff transcription factor
 – mafg transcription factor
 – mafk transcription factor
 – nf-e2 transcription factor, p45 subunit

– nf-e2-related factor 1

– nf-e2-related factor 2

– proto-oncogene proteins c-fos

– proto-oncogene proteins c-jun

– transcription factor ap-1

– butyrate response factor 1

– centromere protein b

– coup transcription factors

– coup transcription factor i

– coup transcription factor ii

– early growth response transcription factors

– early growth response protein 1

– early growth response protein 2

– early growth response protein 3

– erythroid-specific dna-binding factors

– gata1 transcription factor

– gata2 transcription factor

– gata3 transcription factor

– nf-e2 transcription factor
 – maf transcription factors, small
 – maff transcription factor
 – mafg transcription factor
 – mafk transcription factor
 – nf-e2 transcription factor, p45 subunit

– YY1 transcription factor

– factor for inversion stimulation protein

– g-box binding factors

– GATA transcription factors

– gata1 transcription factor

– gata2 transcription factor

– gata3 transcription factor

– gata4 transcription factor

– gata5 transcription factor

– gata6 transcription factor

– hepatocyte nuclear factors

– hepatocyte nuclear factor 1
 – hepatocyte nuclear factor 1-alpha
 – hepatocyte nuclear factor 1-beta

– hepatocyte nuclear factor 3-alpha

– hepatocyte nuclear factor 3-beta

– hepatocyte nuclear factor 3-gamma

– hepatocyte nuclear factor 4

– hepatocyte nuclear factor 6

– heterogeneous-nuclear ribonucleoprotein k

– hmga proteins

– hmga1a protein

– hmga1b protein

– hmga1c protein

– hmga2 protein

– hmgb proteins

– hmgb1 protein

– hmgb2 protein

– hmgb3 protein

– homeodomain proteins

– antennapedia homeodomain protein

– fushi tarazu transcription factors

– goosecoid protein

– mads domain proteins
 – agamous protein, arabidopsis
 – deficiens protein
 – serum response factor

– msx1 transcription factor

– onecut transcription factors
 – hepatocyte nuclear factor 6

– otx transcription factors

– pax7 transcription factor

– i-kappa b proteins

– immunoglobulin j recombination signal sequence-binding protein

– integration host factors

– interferon regulatory factors

– interferon regulatory factor-1

– interferon regulatory factor-2

– interferon regulatory factor-3

– interferon regulatory factor-7

– interferon-stimulated gene factor 3, gamma subunit

– interferon-stimulated gene factor 3

– interferon-stimulated gene factor 3, gamma subunit

– kruppel-like transcription factors

– ikaros transcription factor

– sp transcription factors
 – sp1 transcription factor
 – sp2 transcription factor
 – sp3 transcription factor
 – sp4 transcription factor

– leucine-responsive regulatory protein

– matrix attachment region binding proteins

– methyl-cpg-binding protein 2

– muts dna mismatch-binding protein

– muts homolog 2 protein

– myeloid-lymphoid leukemia protein

– nf-kappa b

– nf-kappa b p50 subunit

– nf-kappa b p52 subunit

– transcription factor rela

– transcription factor relb

– nfi transcription factors

– nuclear respiratory factors

– ga-binding protein transcription factor

– nuclear respiratory factor 1

– oncogene protein p55(v-myc)

– origin recognition complex

– paired box transcription factors

– b-cell-specific activator protein

– pax2 transcription factor

– pax7 transcription factor

– pax9 transcription factor

– pou domain factors

– octamer transcription factors
 – octamer transcription factor-1
 – octamer transcription factor-2
 – octamer transcription factor-3
 – octamer transcription factor-6

– transcription factor brn-3
 – transcription factor brn-3a
 – transcription factor brn-3b
 – transcription factor brn-3c

– transcription factor pit-1

– proto-oncogene proteins c-bcl-6

– proto-oncogene proteins c-ets

– proto-oncogene protein c-ets-1

– proto-oncogene protein c-ets-2

– proto-oncogene protein c-fli-1

– ternary complex factors
 – ets-domain protein elk-1
 – ets-domain protein elk-4

– proto-oncogene proteins c-myb

– proto-oncogene proteins c-myc

– proto-oncogene proteins c-rel

– proto-oncogene proteins c-sis

– rad51 recombinase

– rad52 dna repair and recombination protein

– replication factor A

– replication factor C

– retinoblastoma protein

– sex-determining region y protein

– smad proteins

– smad proteins, receptor-regulated
 – smad1 protein
 – smad3 protein
 – smad5 protein
 – smad8 protein

– smad4 protein

– t-box domain proteins

– tcf transcription factors

– lymphoid enhancer-binding factor 1

– t cell transcription factor 1

– telomere-binding proteins

– heterogeneous-nuclear ribonucleoprotein group a-b

– telomeric repeat binding protein 1

– telomeric repeat binding protein 2

– toll-like receptor 9

– transcription factor ap-2

– transcription factors, general

– pol1 transcription initiation complex proteins

– tata-binding protein associated factors

– tata-box binding protein

– tata box binding protein-like proteins

– transcription factors, tfii
 – transcription factor tfiia
 – transcription factor tfiib
 – transcription factor tfiid
 – tata-box binding protein
 – transcription factor tfiih
 – xeroderma pigmentosum group d protein

– transcription factors, tfiii
 – transcription factor tfiiia
 – transcription factor tfiiib

– tristetraprolin

– tumor suppressor protein p53

– viral regulatory proteins

– gene products, nef

– gene products, rex

– gene products, vif

– gene products, vpu

– immediate-early proteins

– trans-activators
 – herpes simplex virus protein vmw65

– winged-helix transcription factors

– forkhead transcription factors
 – hepatocyte nuclear factor 3-alpha
 – hepatocyte nuclear factor 3-beta
 – hepatocyte nuclear factor 3-gamma

– xeroderma pigmentosum group a protein

The list continues at List of MeSH codes (D12.776) § MeSH D12.776.275.

D12.776.260